Asteronotus hepaticus is a species of sea slug or dorid nudibranch, a marine gastropod mollusk in the family Discodorididae.

Distribution
This species was originally described from the Pacific Ocean. It is known from Vanuatu, Indonesia, the Solomon Islands and Papua New Guinea.

Description
Asteronotus hepaticus is a large dorid nudibranch with a distinctive deep purple colouration.

References

Discodorididae
Gastropods described in 1877